Savage! is a 1973 American-Philippines action film with elements of blaxploitation. The funding and distribution came from Roger Corman's New World Pictures which also provided the leading players from among a number of American actors who regularly appeared in such features. It was produced and directed by Cirio H. Santiago who, between 1973 and his death in 2008, partnered with Corman on over 40 Philippines-based action-adventure exploitation films which took advantage of much lower local production costs.

The title role is played by top-billed James Iglehart, with co-stars Lada Edmund, Jr. and Carol Speed. As in most such productions of the 1970s and 1980s, the setting is not identified as the Philippines, but rather an unspecified Latin American location ruled by a military-based authoritarian regime.

The soundtrack is by Don Julian.

Plot
The main character played by James Iglehart is a criminal on the run who gets involved in a revolution against a military government. An unnamed tropical country in Central or South America is governed by a military dictatorship. Jim Haygood starts out working for the government to defeat rebel forces and capture the rebel leader Moncada. Later he becomes appalled by his superiors' abuses and brutality, subsequently sides with the rebels and becomes known under the nom de guerre "Savage". He is joined by two American friends who are performers at the local American club — knife-thrower Vicki and acrobat Amanda.

Cast
 James Iglehart as Savage 
 Lada Edmund, Jr. as Vicki
 Carol Speed as Amanda
 Sally Jordan as Sylvia
 Rossana Ortiz as Julia
 Ken Metcalfe as Melton
 Vic Diaz as Minister
 Aura Aurea as China 
 Eddie Gutierrez as Flores
 Harley Paton 
 Marie Saunders

See also
List of American films of 1973

References

External links

1973 films
1970s action films
Blaxploitation films
New World Pictures films
Philippine action films
Films shot in the Philippines
1970s English-language films
American action films
American exploitation films
Films directed by Cirio H. Santiago
1970s American films